Rosa Riondo de la Cruz (born 1944) is a Cuban-American businesswoman. A specialist in art and design, she is known as a collector of contemporary art.

Biography
De la Cruz started her art collection in the 1960s, along with her husband, Cuban-American businessman Carlos de la Cruz. Married since 1962, the couple has assembled one of Miami's finest collections of contemporary art, particularly postwar German paintings. Most of her works have been exhibited in the private De la Cruz Collection museum since 2009, 10,000m² dedicated to contemporary art in Miami in a building designed by John Marquette. Rosa and Carlos have five children and live in Key Biscayne, Florida.

Collection
The first work of hers that de la Cruz acquired was "Star Gazer" (1956), by the Mexican artist Rufino Tamayo. The collection includes work by Dan Colen, Kathryn Andrews, Ana Mendieta, Jim Hodges, Martin Kippenberger, Isa Genzken, Christopher Wool, Félix González-Torres, Mark Bradford, Peter Doig, Nate Lowman, Christian Holstad and Sterling Ruby. Other important artists are Wifredo Lam and Salvador Dalí, whose portrait of Carlos de la Cruz's mother, Dolores Suero Falla, belongs to the collection.

In 2016, ArtNews included Rosa de la Cruz among the "Top 200 Collectors".

References

External links
de la Cruz Collection

1944 births
Living people
American art collectors
American women in business
Cuban emigrants to the United States
21st-century American women